Andrew Keegan (born January 29, 1979) is an American actor best known for his roles in television shows including Trinkets, Moesha, Party of Five and 7th Heaven and in films such as 10 Things I Hate about You (1999), The Broken Hearts Club (2000) and O (2001).

Early life
Keegan was born Andrew Keegan Heying in Los Angeles, California, the older son of Lana (Ocampo), a hairdresser, and Larry Heying, a voice-over actor. Keegan's mother is a Colombian immigrant and his father is from Nebraska.

Career
He was first recognized for his performance of teen rebel Zack Dell in the film Camp Nowhere (1994). Keegan was cast in a minor role in the 1996 film Independence Day. He also played a love interest for Stephanie Tanner in the television series Full House for an episode. He had guest parts on numerous television shows before being cast on the TV drama Party of Five (1994). That same year, he landed another recurring role on 7th Heaven (1996), where he played a single teenaged father in love with Jessica Biel's character Mary. Keegan was then cast in two modern-day Shakespearean film adaptations: as the antagonist of Heath Ledger in the 1999 comedy 10 Things I Hate About You (adapted from The Taming of the Shrew) and as Mekhi Phifer's best friend in O, adapted from Othello.

Keegan then took a role in Greg Berlanti's The Broken Hearts Club: A Romantic Comedy (2000), which won Best Picture that year at the GLAAD Awards. In 2009, Keegan made his theatrical stage debut in the play He Asked For It, playing Rigby, a character tackling the emotional issues of being HIV-positive in modern-day society. In 2010, Keegan played Strayger, a drug-smuggling pilot in the 2010 action film Kill Speed. Keegan took on a role as a sadistic and sociopathic vampire named Blake in the film Living Among Us (2015).

In 2014, Keegan founded Full Circle, a community spiritual center based in Venice, Los Angeles. Vice characterized the organization as a "new religion", while other outlets called it a cult. In an interview, Keegan described the group as a "non-denominational spiritual community center where people of all beliefs and backgrounds come together to meditate, practice yoga, and engage artistically." New York Magazine reported in March 2015 that "the actual theology of the group is tough to pin down, but it seems to loosely follow Hinduism—or at least Russell Brand's Sanskrit-tattoo version of it." In May 2015, the Full Circle temple was raided by California Department of Alcoholic Beverage Control officers. The raid was apparently related to Full Circle's distribution of kombucha, a fermented beverage made from sweet black tea. A spokesperson for the temple stated that they were unaware that they needed a license to distribute kombucha.

Personal life 
Keegan has a younger brother, Casey (born June 12, 1980), who is also an actor. His daughter, Aiya Rose Keegan, was born in March 2016.

Filmography

References

External links

American male film actors
American male television actors
Hispanic and Latino American male actors
American male child actors
Male actors from Los Angeles
American male Shakespearean actors
American male stage actors
American people of Colombian descent
1979 births
Living people
Founders of new religious movements
Cult leaders
Self-declared messiahs